Dolichurus greenei is a species of cockroach wasp in the family Ampulicidae.

References

Parasitic wasps
Articles created by Qbugbot
Insects described in 1916